The Chhatrapati Shivaji Maharaj Smarak or Chhatrapati Shivaji Maharaj Memorial is a monument under construction dedicated to Chhatrapati Shivaji Maharaj , the 17th century Indian warrior king and founder of the Maratha Empire. The statue will be located in the Arabian Sea, near the coast of Mumbai, Maharashtra. Memorial construction is expected to be completed by October 2022.

History 

Volunteers collected water from various rivers in the state and soil from Shivaji's forts for the foundation-stone laying ceremony on 24 December 2016 by the Prime Minister Narendra Modi.

In 2016, Egis in India was appointed the Project Management Consultant. Egis in India is the local arm of the France-based Egis group.

On 1 March 2018, a Letter of Acceptance was issued to the contracting firm Larsen & Toubro to commence construction of the project. Initial plans for the project called for the foundation to be built from reclaimed basalt and rubble from the Colaba–SEEPZ metro tunnel. However, due to delays associated with the monument, the rubble is no longer reserved for the monument, and is being transported to quarries for storage.

Project details 

The statue will be  total height from base of pedestal to tip of sword:  statue of horse and rider with a sword  in height, placed on top of a  pedestal. Statue was initially planned for 192 metres, however was increased to 212 metres as the state government wanted to keep the statue as the tallest competing against an upcoming statue Spring Temple Buddha in China. It is expected to be completed in 2021.

The completed vision of the project will include visitor centre buildings, a memorial garden, a library, food court, and convention centre with room for approximately 10,000 people. The memorial will also have a museum, exhibition gallery, amphitheater and hospital. The memorial will showcase replicas of Chatrapati Shivaji Maharaj's forts.

Connectivity 

The memorial will be reachable by boat jetty, helipad and an extension spur of Mumbai Metro.

Since Mumbai has four rainy months every year which makes access to memorial by boat difficult, a 1.2 km undersea metro rail connection from Cuffe Parade on Mumbai Metro Line 3 option for connecting the Shiv Smarak was finalised after considering various ropeway and metro rail options. Earlier, options of another undersea metro rail route from Girgaon Chowpatty, or an aerial ropeway and causeway sea link were also considered before deciding on the shorter Cuffe Parade Metro Link.

Issues

Maharashtra Navnirman Sena president Raj Thackeray had suggested in 2016 that the money could be better utilised for the development and maintenance of the Shivaji's forts and palaces in Maharashtra, many built during the reign of Shivaji maharaj.

The Koli fishing community staged protests in 2017 and expressed their fear that they will lose their livelihood.

Status

In February 2021, the detailed project report from Maharashtra state Public Works Department (PWD) and the environment clearance from the Ministry of Environment, Forest and Climate Change were awaited for the undersea metro rail link from Cuffe Parade to Shiv Smarak.

In August 2021, the project was stalled since January 2019 due to the COVID-19 pandemic, only the bathymetry survey complete while the geotechnical survey was underway. Consequently, state PWD proposed extending project completion date by a year from 18 October 2021 to 18 October 2022.

See also

 List of tallest statues
 List of the tallest statues in India
 List of tourist attractions in Mumbai
 Statue of Equality
 Statue of Ahimsa
 Statue of Unity
 Tourism in Mumbai

References

Monuments and memorials to Shivaji
Proposed statues in India
Monuments and memorials in Mumbai
Buildings and structures in Mumbai
Colossal statues in India
Tourist attractions in Mumbai
Coastal construction